is a passenger railway station located in the town of Misaki, Sennan District, Osaka Prefecture, Japan, operated by the private railway operator Nankai Electric Railway. It has the station number "NK40".

Lines

Layout
The station consists of two opposed side platforms connected by an underground passage. The station is unattended.

Platforms

Adjacent stations

History
Tannowa Station opened on 15 August 1906, initially as a provisional stop, and then with regular services from 1910.

Passenger statistics
In fiscal 2019, the station was used by an average of 2180 passengers daily.

Surrounding area
Sennan Satoumi Park
Tannowa Beach (Tokimeki Beach)
Tannowa Yacht Harbor

See also
 List of railway stations in Japan

References

External links

  

Railway stations in Japan opened in 1906
Railway stations in Osaka Prefecture
Misaki, Osaka